The Gamma Ethniki (C National Amateur Division) is the third highest football league in Greece.

History

The Gamma Ethniki began in 1965 as an amateur championship, while in 1983 it was changed to professional. Although not literally national (it is divided into North and South groups), Football League 2 is considered as a national division.

On 3 August 2010, it was announced that the division had been renamed Football League 2. From season 2013–14, the football League 2 is merged by fourth division championship (Delta Ethniki) and renamed again Gamma Ethniki. The new third division will be held in six groups, with the clubs divided basis of geographical criteria, while it will return in an amateur form. From season 2014–15 until season 2016–17 the league was held in four groups, with the clubs divided basis of geographical criteria. The champion of each group was promoted to Super League 2.

From the 2017–18 season and onwards, the league will be held in eight groups, with the clubs divided by geographical criteria. The first team of each group will be qualified to a play-off tournament, consisted of two groups. The first two teams of each group will be promoted to the Super League 2.

Current groups
106 clubs in 8 groups are competing in the Gamma Ethniki during the 2020–21 season.

Notes
 FCA = Football Clubs Association

Winners

Third Division champions

From 1965 to 1982

From 1982 to 2013

From 2013 to 2019

 1 In bold the champions which promoted to Football League

Fourth Division champions

From 2019 to 2021

 1 In bold the champions which promoted to Super League 2.

Third Division champions

From 2021 to present

 1 In bold the champions which promoted to Super League 2.

See also
Football records and statistics in Greece
Greek football league system
Gamma Ethniki Cup

References

External links
Official website

 
3
Gre
Professional sports leagues in Greece